Colver Historic District is a national historic district located at Barr Township and Cambria Township in Cambria County, Pennsylvania. The district includes 336 contributing buildings, 5 contributing sites, and 3 contributing structures.  The district consists of residential areas, coal mining resources, Cambria and Indiana Railroad shop buildings, and a dairy farm associated with the Ebensburg Coal Company's mine and developed between 1911 and 1943.  Notable buildings include a variety of brick and frame workers' housing, the Ebensburg Coal Company office building (1914), stone company store (1912), Colver Amusement Company (1912), Colver Hotel (1912), Colver Presbyterian Church (1915), public school (1927), hospital (1914), Roundhouse No. 1 (1918), Roundhouse No. 2 (1920), and main power building (1911).

Colver district was listed on the National Register of Historic Places in 1994.

References

External links
All of the following are located in Colver, Cambria County, PA:

Historic districts in Cambria County, Pennsylvania
Historic American Engineering Record in Pennsylvania
National Register of Historic Places in Cambria County, Pennsylvania
Historic districts on the National Register of Historic Places in Pennsylvania
Blacksmith shops